Sanguirana igorota is a species of true frog, family Ranidae. It is endemic to Cordillera Central of the island of Luzon, Philippines. Its closest relative is Sanguirana luzonensis, and it has even been considered synonym of that species; a later study suggests still unresolved relationships between S. igorota, S. luzonensis, and S. tipanan. Common name Taylor's Igorot frog has been coined for this species.

Description
Adult males measure  and adult females  in snout–vent length. The snout is squarish in dorsal view. The tympanum can be translucent. Moderate dorsolateral ridges are present. The dorsum is olive green with bronze spots. The venter is yellow. Fine dorsal asperities are present. The groin is tuberculate. No vocal sac is present in males.

Habitat and conservation
It can be fairly abundant in suitable habitat and tolerates some habitat disturbance. Presumably, breeding takes place in streams; the eggs are laid in water. It is threatened by habitat loss (deforestation) caused by habitat conversion to agriculture or real estate.

References

igorota
Amphibians of the Philippines
Endemic fauna of the Philippines
Fauna of Luzon
Amphibians described in 1922
Taxa named by Edward Harrison Taylor